Chris Budgen is a retired rugby player. He played for Bridgend RFC from 1999-2001 then played the majority of his professional career for Exeter Chiefs and Northampton Saints in the Aviva Premiership.

He made his debut for Exeter on 30 September 2008 against Esher. His position of choice is Prop. Budgen's try against Worcester for Exeter on 3 Nov 2012 made Budgen the oldest try scorer in the Aviva Premiership at 39 years and 287 days., Budgen dedicated this score to his twin sons who died prematurely two weeks before the game.

Budgen remains a very popular and respected figure among fans of both Exeter and Northampton, with Exeter fans nicknaming him "Budgie" and Saints fans nicknaming him "Chicken". Budgen juggled most of his professional career with that of an active soldier; Budgen is stationed on Salisbury Plain and has also seen action in Helmand Province.

It was announced on 24 May 2013 that Budgen would be going into coaching with the Marlborough RFC colts team.

References

External links
 Premiership Player Profile

New Zealand rugby union players
1973 births
Living people
Exeter Chiefs players
Rugby union players from Hamilton, New Zealand
Rugby union props